A tombstone is a stele or marker, usually stone, that is placed over a grave.

Tombstone may also refer to:

Places
 Tombstone, Arizona, U.S.
Tombstone Municipal Airport
 Tombstone (mountain), in Oregon, U.S.
 Tombstone Mountain, in the Canadian Rockies
 Tombstone Territorial Park, including Tombstone Mountain, in Yukon, Canada
 Tombstone Hill, Antarctica

Arts and entertainment
 Tombstone (comics), a Marvel Comics character
 Tombstone (film), a 1993 western
 Tombstone Records, a record label
 Tombstone, the Town Too Tough to Die, a 1942 Western film 
 Tombstone, a book by Yang Jisheng
 Tombstone, a combat robot competing in BattleBots
 "Tombstone" (song), a 2021 song by Rod Wave
 "Tombstone", a 2019 song by Ocean Alley

Other uses
 Tombstone (advertising), a particular type of text-only print advertisement
 Tombstone (financial industry), a type of print notice to formally announce a particular transaction
 Tombstone (data store), a deleted record in a replica of a distributed data store
 Tombstone (manufacturing), a fixture onto which are placed parts to be manufactured
 Tombstone (pizza), a brand of frozen pizza
 Tombstone (programming), a mechanism to detect dangling pointers
 Tombstone (typography), a symbol often used in mathematical proofs
 Tombstone, or museum label, describing exhibited objects
 Tombstone, another ringname of wrestler 911
 TOMB STONE, S-300 surface-to-air missile system radar
 Tombstoning
 Tombstone (surfing),  When surfer is held underwater and tries to climb up their leash the board is straight up and down

See also
 
 Gunfight at the O.K. Corral, an 1881 shootout in Tombstone, Arizona Territory
 Tombstone Piledriver, or kneeling reverse piledriver, a professional wrestling move